Craig Cannonier (born 1963) is a Bermudian politician, who served as Premier of Bermuda from 18 December 2012 until his resignation on 19 May 2014. He has also served as the leader of the One Bermuda Alliance since 10 September 2011.

Personal life
Cannonier was born and raised in St David's. He was educated at St George's Preparatory school and the Bermuda Institute. After obtaining his high school diploma, he attained a BSc in Industrial Psychology from Towson University in 1986.

Career
Cannonier began his career at the MarketPlace Group where his responsibilities included human resources, training and
purchasing. He also served as a general manager of a People's Drug pharmacy location for ten years, during which time he helped that location become an independently owned, rather than become part of CVS acquisition of 490 People's Drug stores. Prior to beginning his association with Esso Bermuda, Cannonier served as a relationship manager for Cable & Wireless. Mr. Craig Cannonier currently runs Esso City Tigermarket, Collector's Hill Esso and Warwick Esso.

In the wake of the "Jetgate" scandal, Cannonier resigned as Premier, with former UBP leader Michael Dunkley taking over the position.

References

External links 
The Hon. L. Craig Cannonier, JP, MP

1962 births
Living people
Premiers of Bermuda
One Bermuda Alliance politicians
Towson University alumni
People from St. George's Parish, Bermuda
Leaders of the Opposition (Bermuda)